The 2017–18 season was FC Barcelona B's 48th season in existence, the 23rd in Segunda División and first season, since promotion from Segunda División B, in the second flight of Spanish football.

Players

Promoted from Juvenil A

|}

Players In

|}
Total expenditure:  €0

Players Out

Total income:  €3.0 million

Balance
Total: €3.0 million

Technical staff

Statistics

Squad statistics
{|class="wikitable" style="text-align: center;"
|-
!
! style="width:70px;"|League
! style="width:70px;"|Cup
! style="width:70px;"|Total Stats
|-
|align=left|Games played       ||40||2||42
|-
|align=left|Games won          ||10||1||11
|-
|align=left|Games drawn        ||13||0||13
|-
|align=left|Games lost         ||17||1||18
|-
|align=left|Goals scored       ||46||3||49
|-
|align=left|Goals conceded     ||52||2||54
|-
|align=left|Goal difference    ||−6||1||−5
|-
|align=left|Clean sheets       ||5||1||6
|-
|align=left|Goal by Substitute || – || – || –
|-
|align=left|Total shots        ||345|| – ||345
|-
|align=left|Shots on target    ||139|| – ||139
|-
|align=left|Corners            || – || – || –
|-
|align=left|Players used       || – || – || –
|-
|align=left|Offsides           || 52 || – || 52
|-
|align=left|Fouls suffered     ||610|| – ||610
|-
|align=left|Fouls committed    ||495|| – ||495
|-
|align=left|Yellow cards       ||91||2||93
|-
|align=left|Red cards          ||1||1||2
|-

Players Used: Barcelona B has used a total of 20 different players in all competitions.

Goalscorers

Last updated: 25 May 2018

Hat-tricks

(H) – Home ; (A) – Away

Clean sheets
As of 22 November 2017.

Disciplinary record

Includes all competitive matches. Players listed below made at least one appearance for Barcelona B first squad during the season.

Injury record

Pre-season and friendlies

Competitions

Copa Catalunya

Segunda División

League table

Results summary

Results by round

Matches

References

External links

FC Barcelona Atlètic seasons
2017–18 Segunda División
B
Barcelona B